The 2016–17 American Athletic Conference men's basketball season began with practices in October 2016, followed by the start of the 2016–17 NCAA Division I men's basketball season in November. The conference held its media day on October 24, 2016. Conference play began on December 27, 2016 and concluded on March 4, 2017.

SMU won the regular season championship by one game over Cincinnati. The American Athletic Conference tournament was held from March 9 through March 12 at the XL Center in Hartford, Connecticut. SMU defeated Cincinnati in the tournament championship to earn the conference's automatic bid to the NCAA tournament. Simi Ojeleye was named the Tournament MVP.

SMU's Semi Ojeleye was also named the conference's Player of the Year. SMU's head coach, Tim Jankovich, was named Coach of the Year.

Two AAC teams were invited to the NCAA Tournament, Cincinnati and SMU. Houston and UCF received bids to the NIT.

Head coaches

Coaching changes
Josh Pastner left Memphis for the Georgia Tech job and was replaced by Texas Tech coach Tubby Smith.
Larry Brown resigned as SMU coach on July 8, 2016. Tim Jankovich, who had been hired along with Brown in 2012 as his top assistant and designated successor, was elevated to the top spot.
Tulane fired Ed Conroy. Former NBA coach Mike Dunleavy was hired for his first college coaching job, after a six-year hiatus from coaching.
 UCF fired Donnie Jones was fired on March 10 after six seasons. Johnny Dawkins was hired after being fired by Stanford.

Coaches

Notes:
 Overall and AAC records are from time at current school and are through the end of 2016–17 season. NCAA records include time at current school only.
 AAC records are only from 2013–14 season to present, prior conference records not included.
 Orlando Antigua was fired after the first 13 games of the season amid academic fraud allegations. Murry Bartow was named interim coach for the remainder of the season.
 Jeff Lebo underwent hip surgery on January 16, 2017 and missed the rest of the 2016–17 season. Assistant coach Michael Perry took over as head coach in Lebo's absence.

Preseason

Preseason Coaches Poll 

AAC Media Day took place October 24, 2016, in Philadelphia, Pennsylvania. Cincinnati was picked to win the conference's regular season (six votes) with Connecticut a close second (five votes).

first place votes in parentheses

Preseason All-AAC Teams

Source

Rankings

Conference matrix

Honors and awards
Semi Ojeleye was an honorable mention AP All-American.

All-AAC awards and teams 
On March 7, the AAC announced its conference awards.

Postseason

2017 American Athletic Conference tournament

NCAA tournament

NIT

NBA draft
The following list includes all AAC players who were drafted in the 2017 NBA draft.

References